Chaenactis douglasii is a North American species of flowering plant in the daisy family known by the common name Douglas' dustymaiden.

Description
Chaenactis douglasii is a variable herb, generally a perennial. Stem leaves become smaller and stalkless upwards.

The flower head is lined with flat, glandular, blunt-pointed phyllaries and contains several white or pinkish tubular disc flowers with protruding anthers.

Varieties
 Chaenactis douglasii var. alpina A.Gray 
 Chaenactis douglasii var. douglasii

Distribution
The plant is found in western Canada and the western United States from British Columbia to Saskatchewan, and south to California to New Mexico, with a few isolated populations in Nebraska and the Dakotas. It grows in a wide variety of habitats, including harsh environments such as rock fields in alpine climates in the Sierra Nevada, east of the crest of the Cascade Range of Washington and Oregon, scrubland and desert, and disturbed areas such as roadsides.

Uses
Some Plateau Indian tribes used this plant as a dressing for burns, wounds, and sores.

References

External links

Jepson Manual Treatment of Chaenactis douglasii
United States Department of Agriculture Plants Profile for Chaenactis douglasii
Chaenactis douglasii — Calphotos Photo gallery, University of California

douglasii
Plants described in 1833
Flora of the Western United States
Flora of Western Canada
Natural history of the California Coast Ranges
Natural history of the Mojave Desert
Alpine flora
Plants used in traditional Native American medicine
Flora without expected TNC conservation status